Centenário is a municipality located in the Brazilian state of Tocantins. Its population was 2,936 (2020) and its area is 1,955 km².

References

Municipalities in Tocantins